Rosonabant (INN; E-6776) is a drug acting as a CB1 receptor antagonist/inverse agonist that was under investigation by Esteve as an appetite suppressant for the treatment of obesity. Development of the drug for clinical use was apparently halted shortly after the related CB1 antagonist rimonabant was discontinued in November 2008, due to the reports of severe psychiatric adverse effects such as anxiety, depression, and suicidal ideation associated with it and with similarly acting agents.

See also
Cannabinoid receptor antagonist

References

Anorectics
Cannabinoids
Carboxamides
CB1 receptor antagonists
Chlorobenzenes
Piperidines
Pyrazolines